Hillel H. Ticktin is a Marxist theorist and economist. He was born in South Africa in 1937, but had to leave to avoid arrest for political activism. He then lived and studied in the Soviet Union, where his PhD thesis, which was critical of official Communist Parties, was rejected. In 1965 he began teaching at Glasgow University, which in 2000 appointed him professor of Marxist studies. He retired in 2002. In 1973, he co-founded Critique, a Journal of Socialist Theory.

He is an honorary senior research fellow in social sciences administration, and an honorary professorial research fellow in the School of Social and Political Sciences at Glasgow University.

References

External links 
 Hillel Ticktin's 'Commentary on Crisis' editorials (published 4 times a year).

1937 births
British political writers
Stalinism-era scholars and writers
Historians of communism
British Marxists
South African Marxists
Living people
British economists
Marxist theorists
Marxist writers
Academics of the University of Glasgow
British social commentators